was a village located in Munakata District, Fukuoka Prefecture, Japan.  The village consisted of the island of Okinoshima and an island also named Ōshima.

As of 2003, the village had an estimated population of 873 and a density of 107.25 persons per km². The total area was 8.14 km².

On March 28, 2005, Ōshima was merged into the expanded city of Munakata.

External links
 Munakata official website 

Populated places disestablished in 2005
2005 disestablishments in Japan
Dissolved municipalities of Fukuoka Prefecture
Munakata, Fukuoka